The National PGA Classic is a professional golf tournament played in Victoria, Australia. The Moonah Links PGA Classic was held in February 2021 while The National PGA Classic will be held in April 2022.

The Moonah Links PGA Classic was held on the Moonah Links the week after it had hosted the Victorian PGA Championship. It was added to the 2020–21 schedule following a number of tournament cancellations. With the prospect of travel difficulties, the final 36 holes were played on a Thursday. The National PGA Classic was added to the 2021–22 schedule following the cancellation of events in New Zealand. It will be played on the Gunnamatta course.

Winners

References

External links
Coverage on PGA Tour of Australasia's official site

PGA Tour of Australasia events
Golf tournaments in Australia
Golf in Victoria (Australia)